Menus for Moderns is an Australian television series which aired 1960-1961. It was a cooking show featuring Doreen Andrews.

Produced by and aired on Sydney station ATN-7 (this was prior to the creation of the Seven Network), it was a daytime series. The series aired in a half-hour time-slot on Mondays. At one point the series aired at 2:00PM, competing in the time-slot against Woman's World on ABN-2 and Happy Go Lucky on TCN-9.

See also
The Jean Bowring Show
The Chef Presents

References

External links
Menus for Moderns at IMDb

1960 Australian television series debuts
1961 Australian television series endings
Australian cooking television series
Black-and-white Australian television shows
English-language television shows